Sauropodichnus is an ichnogenus of dinosaur footprint. In 2020 Molina-Perez and Larramendi based on the 90 cm (2.95 ft) long footprint estimated the size of the animal at 26 meters (85 ft) and 40 tonnes (44 short tons).

See also

 List of dinosaur ichnogenera

References

 

Dinosaur trace fossils
Sauropods